Wilfred Ernest Harris (24 April 1919 – 4 December 1996) was a former Welsh cricketer. Harris was a right-handed batsman who bowled right-arm medium-pace. He was born at Cardiff, Glamorgan.

Cricket
In 1937, Harris played 2 Minor Counties Championship matches for the Glamorgan Second XI against the Kent Second XI. The following season Harris played his first first-class match for Glamorgan against Kent in the County Championship. From 1938 to 1939, he played 3 first-class matches for Glamorgan, finally playing his last first-class match following the Second World War in 1947 against Yorkshire at Bramall Lane, Sheffield.

Personal life
Harris played club cricket for St. Fagan's Cricket Club from the mid-1930s to the mid-1980s, becoming a stalwart of the club for 5 decades.  He also worked in administrative section of University College, Cardiff, where the eventually became the registrar. Later in life he served on the Glamorgan County Cricket Club committee and was the match manager when England played Australia in a One Day International at St. Helen's.  Harris died on 4 December 1996. His brother Leslie Harris also played first-class cricket for Glamorgan.

References

External links
Ernie Harris at Cricinfo
Ernie Harris at CricketArchive

1919 births
1996 deaths
Cricketers from Cardiff
Welsh cricketers
Glamorgan cricketers